"I've Been Waiting" is a song by American recording artists Lil Peep and iLoveMakonnen featuring American band Fall Out Boy. It was released on January 31, 2019, through Columbia Records. It peaked at number sixty-two on the US Billboard Hot 100 chart, becoming Lil Peep's second highest-charting song. It was certified Gold by the Recording Industry of America (RIAA), becoming his second Gold certification.

Background
According to iLoveMakonnen, the song was one of roughly twenty songs that he had worked on with Lil Peep before his death. It began as a demo from iLoveMakonnen that Lil Peep was introduced to in July 2017 and liked.

After Lil Peep's death in November 2017, Pete Wentz from Fall Out Boy reached out to iLoveMakonnen, offering condolences. iLoveMakonnen told Wentz that both he and Lil Peep were fans of Fall Out Boy, leading the band to collaborate on the song, which iLoveMakonnen felt was the best fit for them. He solicited help from more songwriters and record producers to complete the song.

The original version of the song without Fall Out Boy was included on the Everybody's Everything compilation album.

Reception
Ton Sheperd of Kerrang! described the song as an "out-and-out pop jam", while praising Lil Peep's performance.

Charts

Certifications

References

2019 singles
2019 songs
ILoveMakonnen songs
Lil Peep songs
Fall Out Boy songs
Songs released posthumously
Songs written by Lil Peep
Songs written by Louis Bell
Songs written by Patrick Stump
Songs written by Brian Lee (songwriter)
Songs written by Pete Wentz
Songs written by Andy Hurley
Songs written by iLoveMakonnen
Song recordings produced by Louis Bell